You're Mine You is a 1962 studio album by the American jazz singer Sarah Vaughan, orchestrated and conducted by Quincy Jones.

Reception

The Allmusic review by Scott Yanow awarded the album three stars and said that "Vaughan's voice is typically wondrous and sometimes a bit excessive on the ballads (some may find her slightly overblown version of 'Maria' a bit difficult to sit through) but in top form on the more swinging numbers."

Track listing
 "You're Mine You" (Johnny Green, Edward Heyman) – 3:59
 "The Best Is Yet to Come" (Cy Coleman, Carolyn Leigh) – 2:59
 "Witchcraft" (Coleman, Leigh) – 2:55
 "So Long" (Remus Harris, Irving Melsher, Russ Morgan) – 2:52
 "The Second Time Around" (Sammy Cahn, Jimmy Van Heusen) – 3:40
 "I Could Write a Book" (Lorenz Hart, Richard Rodgers) – 2:21
 "Maria" (Leonard Bernstein, Stephen Sondheim) – 3:11
 "Baubles, Bangles and Beads" (George Forrest, Robert C. Wright) – 3:39
 "Fly Me to the Moon" (Bart Howard) – 2:54
 "Moonglow" (Eddie DeLange, Will Hudson, Irving Mills) – 2:28
 "Invitation" (Bronisław Kaper, Paul Francis Webster) – 2:16
 "On Green Dolphin Street" (Kaper, Ned Washington) – 3:01
Bonus tracks on compact disc

Personnel 
 Sarah Vaughan – vocals
 Quincy Jones - arranger, conductor

References

1962 albums
Sarah Vaughan albums
Roulette Records albums
Albums arranged by Quincy Jones
Albums conducted by Quincy Jones